Josef Bauer (10 June 1915, Wasserburg am Inn – 15 July 1989) was a German politician of the Christian Social Union of Bavaria.

Bauer started from 1953 as a town councillor in Bavaria. He belonged to the German Bundestag from 1953 to 1969.

From 1963 to 1969 he was deputy chairman of the CSU regional committee in CDU/CSU the Bundestag faction. He represented the constituency Altötting in the parliament.

From 1962 to 1970 Bauer was also state parliament delegate for the CSU in Bavaria.

He was governor of Landkreis Wasserburg am Inn from 1970 to 1972.

See also
List of Bavarian Christian Social Union politicians

1915 births
1989 deaths
Members of the Bundestag for Bavaria
People from Wasserburg am Inn
Members of the Bundestag for the Christian Social Union in Bavaria